Black Tangerine is the third studio album by Taiwanese singer-songwriter David Tao, released 9 August 2002.

The album was awarded one of the Top 10 Selling Mandarin Albums of the Year at the 2002 IFPI Hong Kong Album Sales Awards, presented by the Hong Kong branch of IFPI.

Track listing

References

David Tao albums
2002 albums